Calabogie Motorsports Park is the longest road course in Canada at  located  east of the community of Calabogie in the township of Greater Madawaska, Ontario, Canada. It hosts regional road racing and is the main circuit in the Ottawa metropolitan area.

Events 
The Park, which opened in September 2006, has played host to multiple club racing events. The track also been visit those two years by the Castrol Canadian touring Championship from 2007 to 2009.

The track previously hosted the Canadian Superbike Championship opening round in 2008 on the Stadium track, and on the full track in 2009.

The inaugural race of the GT3 Cup Challenge have been held from May 14 to May 15, 2011. This marked the first time the Challenge, which held 120 events and 255 championship rounds in 2011, was brought to Canada.

The Park has also been used as a testing track for the Harley-Davidson XR1200 and Ford GT.

Features 
Calabogie Motorsports Park hosts vehicle manufactures, corporate and private groups, car clubs and driver education events both for cars and motorcycles and features the following specifications.
Motorsport Safety Foundation (MSF) Level 2 certified facility
5.05 km in length
Two separate track configurations, 2.2 km & 2.8 km
40’ wide polymer asphalt surface
2000’ long straight
20+ turns
 Approx. 6.25 acres of asphalt paddock area

The park received approval from the Ontario Power Authority to begin installing solar panels on the rooftop of the Park's  garage in an effort to combat air pollution by creating an alternative source of energy for the Park and surrounding area.

Infrastructure 
800 sq ft classroom space
600 sq ft covered lounge area
6 fully equipped executive suites
2 bunk rooms with common living area (4 people per bunk room)
30’ x 30’ concrete base, covered/tent area
Onsite fuel (91and 94 octane)
Electric vehicle charging stations

Programs offered 
High Performance Driving Experiences (HPDE) with your own vehicle
Fully track prepared vehicle rental for use on the track at various events
Race car driving experiences
Novice Day track events
Introductory driving events
Evening lapping events
Monthly evening race series for GT, PT, Spec Miata and open wheel (Libre) race cars

See also 
 List of auto racing tracks in Canada

References

External links 

Guide to Calabogie Motorsports Park at Trackpedia.com
Video of the Porsche GT3 Cup Challenge at Calabogie Motorsports Park

Road racing venues in Canada
Motorsport venues in Ontario
Motorsport in Canada